Woodmancote is a Cotswolds village near Cirencester, Gloucestershire, England. The village lies just off the A435.

The hamlet is typically made up of Cotswold stone cottages, a single Mansion house and a mix of some more modern dwellings and is surrounded by farm land. Woodmancote has no pub, shop, church or other facilities, the nearest being Rendcomb or North Cerney. 

In 1870-72, John Marius Wilson's Imperial Gazetteer of England and Walesdescribed Woodmancote like this: WOODMANCOTE, a tything in North Cerney parish, Gloucester; 4¼ miles NNW of Cirencester. Pop., 256.

Villages in Gloucestershire
Cotswold District